Qarah Torpaq (also Romanized as Qarah Torpāq, Qarah Tūprāq, Qarā Toprāq, Qarāturbāq, Qareh Toprāq, and Qareh Towprāq) is a village in Akhtarabad Rural District, in the Central District of Malard County, Tehran Province, Iran. At the 2006 census, its population was 508, in 114 families.

References 

Populated places in Malard County